The 1947 U.S. Open was the 47th U.S. Open, held June 12–15 at St. Louis Country Club in Ladue, Missouri, a suburb west of St. Louis. Lew Worsham denied Sam Snead his elusive U.S. Open title by prevailing in an 18-hole playoff. For Snead, it was his second of four career runner-up finishes at the Open.

In the third round, amateur Jim McHale Jr. tied the tournament record with a 65, and he established a new nine-hole record with a 30 on the front nine. That mark was equaled fifteen times before it was broken in 1995 by Neal Lancaster, who carded a 29 on the back nine in the final round.

Worsham's win marked the 17th consecutive victory in a major championship for an American-born golfer. This remains the longest stretch ever for American golfers. A significant reason this occurred is because the British Open, which is usually won by international golfers, was cancelled for most of the 1940s due to World War II.

The purse was $10,000 with a winner's share of $2,000 and $1,500 for the runner-up. In addition, both playoff participants received a $500 bonus.

Course layout

Source:

Past champions in the field

Made the cut 

Source:

Missed the cut 

Source:

Round summaries

First round
Thursday, June 12, 1947

Source:

Second round
Friday, June 13, 1947

Source:

Third round
Saturday, June 14, 1947 (morning)

Source:

Final round
Saturday, June 14, 1947

Worsham began the final round with a stroke lead over Snead and Bobby Locke. A front-nine 33 kept him in the lead, but after three bogeys on the back he had to settle for a 71 and a 282 total. Snead overcame two early bogeys with birdies at 5, 6, and 15. After a bogey at 17, Snead needed a birdie on the 72nd hole to tie Worsham and force a playoff the next day. Locke shot 73 to finish three strokes back, in a tie for third place.

Source:
(a) denotes amateur

Playoff 
Sunday, June 15, 1947

In the 18-hole playoff on Sunday morning, Snead led Worsham by two strokes with just three holes remaining. Worsham birdied the par-3 16th with a  putt and Snead bogeyed 17 after he missed the fairway and overshot the green from the rough. Both put lengthy drives in the fairway, and Snead's approach shot stopped pin-high and  left of the hole. Worsham was long and lay  feet past the cup on the apron of the green. Snead left it well short and as he prepared to hole out in continuation, Worsham called for an official to determine who was further away. With a tape measure, it was determined that it remained Snead's turn, who was visibly flustered with the unnecessary interruption and delay. Snead missed the  putt. Worsham then rolled in his par-saving putt for a 69 and the title, which averted an additional 18-hole playoff in the afternoon.

Prize money includes $500 playoff bonus for each.

Scorecard

{|class="wikitable" span = 50 style="font-size:85%;
|-
|style="background: Pink;" width=10|
|Birdie
|style="background: PaleGreen;" width=10|
|Bogey
|style="background: Green;" width=10|
|Double bogey
|}
Source:

References

External links
USGA Championship Database

U.S. Open (golf)
Golf in Missouri
U.S. Open
U.S. Open
U.S. Open
U.S. Open